Spirit Mountain is in the Beartooth Mountains in the U.S. state of Montana. The peak is one of the tallest in the Beartooth Mountains and is in the Absaroka-Beartooth Wilderness, in Custer National Forest.

Climate

Based on the Köppen climate classification, Spirit Mountain is located in a subarctic climate zone characterized by long, usually very cold winters, and mild summers. Winter temperatures can drop below −10 °F with wind chill factors below −30 °F.

References

Spirit
Beartooth Mountains
Mountains of Carbon County, Montana